Mauro Radaelli (born 1 November 1967) is an Italian former professional racing cyclist. He rode in four editions of the Tour de France, three editions of the Giro d'Italia and two editions of the Vuelta a España.

Major results

1993
 1st Trofeo Papà Cervi
 1st 
 1st Stage 1a Grand Prix Guillaume Tell
 3rd Circuito del Porto-Trofeo Arvedi
 3rd Trofeo Zsšdi
 5th Gran Premio della Liberazione
1994
 1st  Sprints classification, Vuelta a España
1997
 1st  Sprints classification, Vuelta a España
 3rd Giro del Mendrisiotto
1998
 1st Stage 1 Steiermark Rundfahrt
2001
 2nd Sparkassen Giro Bochum
 5th Giro del Piemonte
 7th Coppa Bernocchi
 10th Gran Premio Bruno Beghelli
2002
 3rd Giro di Romagna
 7th GP Industria Artigianato e Commercio Carnaghese
 9th Coppa Bernocchi
 9th Coppa Placci

References

External links
 

1967 births
Living people
Italian male cyclists
Cyclists from the Province of Bergamo
People from Caravaggio, Lombardy